Hupehsuchus is an extinct genus of small marine reptiles, about 1 m (3 ft) long, found in the area of Hubei in China. This marine reptile lived in the Olenekian stage of the Early Triassic period.

Description
 
Hupehsuchus was similar to its close relative, Nanchangosaurus, but differed from it in a number of ways. For example, Hupehsuchus had heavier armor on its back than Nanchangosaurus, and its back spines were more finely divided, giving it a more crocodile-like appearance than Nanchangosaurus. It had a thin, long snout like a gharial, river dolphin, or ichthyosaur, which it probably used to snag fish or probe for aquatic invertebrates.

Classification
Exactly to what species Hupehsuchus is related  is unknown. Fairly clearly, it shares a close relationship with Nanchangosaurus, but other relations are unknown. Many features, including the discovery of polydactyly, suggest that Hupehsuchus is related to the ichthyosaurs, but the fact that Hupehsuchus''' extra digits include more bones in the hand, rather than just the fingers as in the ichthyosaurs, may discredit that theory. It, along with Nanchangosaurus, seems to be so different from any other reptile that a new order has been constructed for the two genera called Hupehsuchia.

References

 Chinese Fossil Vertebrates by Spencer G. Lucas
 The World Encyclopedia of Dinosaurs and Prehistoric Creatures'' by Dougal Dixon

Triassic ichthyosauromorphs
Early Triassic reptiles of Asia
Hupehsuchians
Ichthyosauromorph genera